Captain James Douglas 'Chummy' Prentice  was a Royal Navy and Royal Canadian Navy officer who served with distinction in the Battle of the Atlantic. In addition to being credited with the destruction of four U-boats while at sea, he also played a significant role ashore in training the often inexperienced recruits required by the Royal Canadian Navy to fulfill its expanded wartime role.

Naval career
Although born and raised in British Columbia, he decided to join the Royal Navy in 1912 when his father forbade him from joining the newly formed Royal Canadian Navy. He retired from the RN in 1934 as a Lieutenant Commander when cutbacks during the Great Depression ended his possibility of promotion. He returned to British Columbia after his retirement from the Royal Navy and had been ranching for a living when the Second World War broke out in 1939.

After an initial period ashore in Sydney, Nova Scotia Prentice was appointed Senior Officer, Canadian Corvettes under Commodore Leonard W. Murray. This action would lead to Prentice receiving the DSO.

After his time in corvettes, Prentice was assigned to develop training and doctrine for the new Canadian destroyers that entered into service in 1942. In March 1943 the RCN disseminated Prentice's tactical manual for Atlantic convoy escort commanders, Hints on Escort Work, which called for 'quick attacks' on U-boats using Corvettes. After a time as senior officer of Escort Group C5 in the Mid-Atlantic, Prentice became senior officer of Escort Group 11 for Operation Overlord. For these actions, Prentice was awarded the Distinguished Service Cross (DSC) on 28 November and bar a week later.

Prentice finished the war as a full captain. After a time as Aide-de-Camp to the Governor General of Canada, he retired in 1946. He died in British Columbia in 1979.

See also
 Convoy SC 42

References

External links 
 
 Canada's 25 Most Renowned Military Leaders

Canadian recipients of the Distinguished Service Cross (United Kingdom)
Canadian military personnel of World War II
Canadian Companions of the Distinguished Service Order
Royal Navy personnel of World War I
Royal Canadian Navy officers
1899 births
1979 deaths